The men's 10 km classic competition of the 2015 Winter Universiade was held at the Sporting Centre FIS Štrbské Pleso on January 28.

Results

References 

Men's 10km